Ballads and Blues may refer to:

Ballads & Blues (Milt Jackson album), 1956
Odetta Sings Ballads and Blues, 1957 debut album by folk singer Odetta
Ballads & Blues (The Mastersounds album), 1959
Ballads, Blues and Boasters a 1964 album by Harry Belafonte
Ballads and Blues (Miles Davis album), compilation album by American jazz musician Miles Davis
Ballads and Blues (George Winston album), 1972 debut album by American pianist George Winston
Ballads & Blues (Tommy Flanagan album), 1978
Ballads & Blues 1982–1994, compilation album by Northern-Irish rock musician Gary Moore
Ballads, Blues & Stories a 2001 album by Bret Michaels